Nocturnal Symphony was the demo album that Gus G. recorded with his friends as a showcase for his talents to attract a record deal under the pseudonym of Firewind. However Firewind wasn't formed as a band until after Gus  had toured and recorded with Dream Evil, Nightrage, and Mystic Prophecy almost four years later. The album has two unofficial covers which have proved to be the most recognisable, seeing as there are only 500 copies of the album and the original and official album cover.

Track listing
 "Intro" – 0:37
 "Down" – 4:22
 "I'm Not Kind" – 4:44
 "Promised Land" – 5:31
 "Inside" – 6:09
 "Beneath the Eclipsed Moon" (instrumental) – 3:17
 "Lost Dream" – 6:30
 "Distant Thoughts" – 5:15
 "Speed of Terror" – 4:31
 "Nocturnal Symphony" (instrumental) – 4:30

Personnel
Brandon Pender – vocals
Gus G. – guitars, bass
Matt Scurfield – drums

References

Firewind albums
1998 albums